Bénédicte Simon (born 2 June 1997) is a French professional footballer who plays as a defender for Serie A club Juventus F.C..

Club career 
Bénédicte Simon began learning to play football at FC Mantois, a club in her hometown. In 2015, she moved up to France's Division 2, playing with FC Aurillac Arpajon.

In 2016, she joined the Stade de Reims on a four-year deal, which was still in France's Division 2. In 2019, she gained promotion to the Division 1 Féminine with the club.

On 15 June 2020, she signed for Paris Saint-Germain on a three year deal. Simon made her debut with PSG on 25 September 2020 against her former club Stade de Reims. She played her first Champions League match with of her career in a Round of 16 tie against Górnik Łęczna. PSG won the first Division 1 Féminine title of their history that season, but Simon only played 280 minutes across all competitions.

Simon was sent to Atlético Madrid on loan without an option to buy for the 2021–22 season.

International career 
In April 2021, she was called up for international duty for the first time with the French under-23 team.

Honors
Reims
 Division 2 Féminine: 2018–19

Paris Saint-Germain
 Division 1 Féminine: 2020–21

References

External links
 Profile at Soccerway
 Profile at La Liga
 Profile at Paris Saint-Germain

1997 births
Living people
Black French sportspeople
French women's footballers
France women's youth international footballers
Division 2 Féminine players
Stade de Reims Féminines players
Paris Saint-Germain Féminine players
Division 1 Féminine players
Atlético Madrid Femenino players
Primera División (women) players
Women's association football fullbacks
Women's association football defenders